is a Japanese 2008 romance manga by Kanae Hazuki. An anime adaptation by Zexcs aired from October 6 to December 30, 2012. In North America, the manga is published by Kodansha USA and the anime is licensed by Sentai Filmworks. A live action film was released on July 12, 2014.

Plot
Quiet and unassuming Mei Tachibana has spent her high school years without making friends or getting a boyfriend. A childhood incident in which her friends turned out to be toxic and shallow left her scared of disappointment, leading her to be cautious around people - too cautious. She encounters a popular boy named Yamato Kurosawa, who becomes interested in her, and it is through their tentative friendship and blossoming relationship that Mei ultimately begins to branch out and befriend others.

Characters

Live-action Actor: Haruna Kawaguchi
Since Mei used to be constantly  bullied as a child and her classmates blamed her for an accident she never did, she decides to never befriend anyone again and all she needed to survive was herself. At first, she is viewed by others as "freakishly gloomy" and someone who "doesn't speak" but in addition to being anti-social and clumsy, she is also observant, kind, honest, supportive, and funny. As she eventually falls in love with Yamato Kurosawa, she starts to believe that not everyone is selfish and finally begins to have true friends.

Live-action Actor: Sota Fukushi
One of the most popular boys in school. He was known for having kissed almost every girl at school. When he first meets Mei, she kicks him down the stairs under the false belief that he was trying to lift her skirt when in reality it was his friend Kenji who did it. Instantly attracted to her due to her different personality from all the other girls he has met, he gives her his cellphone number and tries to befriend her. When a stalker harasses Mei, she calls Yamato for help and when he arrives, he kisses Mei to get the stalker to go away. Over time, Yamato falls in love with Mei and they start dating. He cares for Mei more than anything and her feelings matter the most to him. Asami describes Yamato as someone who thinks of others more than anyone else, protects what should be protected, and cares for others despite having his own problems to deal with. In his past, he had even slept with Aiko because she was depressed and she insisted it would make her happy. When it comes to his career choice, after encouragement from Mei, he decides to become a photographer, with help from Kitagawa.

 
Live-action Actor: Rima Nishizaki
Mei's classmate and friend who has complex feelings about her large chest. She hates it when people always stare at her chest and that no one seems to like her for who she is. She idolizes Yamato because he defended her from boys teasing her about her chest in middle school, and wishes for a prince of her own to protect her. She starts to date Kenji after he confesses that he likes her for who she is, not just the size of her breasts.

Live-action Actor: Tasuku Nagase
One of Mei's classmates, and a good friend of Yamato's. He is perverted and has a big crush on Asami. Using Mei's help, he eventually confesses to her. The two become a couple.

Live-action Actor: Rika Adachi
A classmate of Yamato and Mei's. She's brazen and bad-mouthed, but has a nice and friendly side. She's liked Yamato ever since he told her that her natural self was the prettiest, but he doesn't reciprocate her feelings. She strongly believes that love requires self-sacrifice and effort, which prompts her to go to extreme lengths for her boyfriends, for example she used multiple cosmetics to look pretty for her old boyfriend despite breaking out. She lost 20kg to try to get Yamato to become her boyfriend, but this caused her to have scars due to sudden weight loss. After Mei stands up for her, she learns to accept Mei as a friend and supports her through tough times. She ends up dating Masashi.

 
Live-action Actor: Ryosuke Yamamoto
Aiko's lover and the only one she feels she can show her "entire" body to. He loved her even when she was overweight.

A classmate of Yamato and Mei's. He has slept with many girls just to feel as "popular" as Yamato. His childhood friend, Chiharu, is one of the few people who treats him as a friend and respects him for who he is. After he fails to seduce Mei and is beat up by some thugs, he realizes that Chiharu is the only one who actually cares for him. He eventually reciprocates her feelings for him and they start dating.

She is Kakeru's childhood friend and knows his true self. She has a crush on Kakeru and they eventually start to go out after he recognizes his feelings for her. She works alongside Mei at Bakery Farm.

Live-action Actor: Alissa Yagi
An amateur model and transfer student who is placed in Yamato's class. She acts sweet, but in reality is trying to cut Mei off from the rest of their friends and steal Yamato. During her childhood, she was called 'ugly' and 'plain'. After realizing that few people actually think of her as a friend even though she tries to please them by paying for meals and giving gifts, she finds true friendship in her childhood friends, Momo and Asami. In addition, she begins to ignore what others say about her and cuts her hair as a sign that she is going to make her future decisions without worrying about others' opinions of her. Later, she moves to Paris temporarily to try modelling there instead of just in Japan and begin dating a Parisian photographer name Angelo.

Live-action Actor: Tomohiro Ichikawa
Yamato's junior high friend who was bullied. Because he hid himself and neglected his studies while being bullied, he decided to return to his hometown and repeat his first year of high school so he is currently a grade behind Yamato and Mei, despite being the same age as them. Since being bullied, he has grown significantly in stature as well as exercised so he is also much stronger than he used to be. He feels a connection with Mei because they were both bullied at some point in their life. He is also a regular patron of the Bakery where Mei works and loves the theme park "Land". He is in love with Mei, but accepts that she is in love with Yamato and tries to protect her. Later he begins to accept Rin's feelings in chapter 50 of the manga.

Yamato's younger sister. She is good at cooking sweets and making stuffed animals. When Yamato first introduces Mei to her, Nagi disliked Mei because she felt that Mei was stealing her brother. After spending time with Mei, she realizes that they have a lot in common: they both had many friends until they turned against them. Afterwards, Nagi accepts Mei and teaches her how to bake cookies for Yamato as well as wanting to hang out with her more.

Yamato's older brother. He runs a barber shop and is said to be just as handsome as Yamato. He rejects styling people if they want to imitate others and instead styles their hair according to what they want to be. Due to the death of his ex-girlfriend in the past, Daichi had a hard time confess his feeling to his barber's assistant Kyouko, who is also had a crush on him.

She is rumored to be Yamato's first love, since she is the only girl in their high school whom he has not kissed. She has a deep interest in Yamato and flirts with him when they go to a restaurant. Yamato, however, rejects her advances.'
Aoi Ren
A quiet and kind boy who is the same grade as Takemura. Despite growing up in the same environment as his twin sister Rin, he is quiet, antisocial and often plays video games. He helps Mei lose weight when he assists in the gym, then later helps her get started on Mei and Asami's career path toward being a preschool caretaker/ teacher.
Aoi Rin
An model who replaces Megumi after she leaves for Paris. Very tall and loud, compared to her small and quiet brother. She has a big crush on Takemura, and has no problem confessing her love for him, who slowly begins to accept her as his love, too. But for some problem, her and Takemura broke up and she later become an international model.
Mei's Mother

She was always worried about her daughter not being able to find happiness and she wants everyone to see Mei for who she really is. However, after meeting Yamato she is convinced that he will take care of her. She keeps a picture of her husband, who died from cancer, in her room.

Media

Manga
The manga is both written and illustrated by Kanae Hazuki and began serialization in Japan in Kodansha's Dessert magazine. It was later obtained by Kodansha USA for publishing in North America starting in April 2014. The sixth manga volume was released in two versions, a regular edition and a special edition with the latter being bundled with a special CD. The eleventh manga volume was also released in both regular and limited editions with the latter being bundled with an original video animation DVD. Eighteen tankōbon volumes have been released. The manga ended serialization on July 24, 2017.

Volume list

Anime

An anime adaptation by Zexcs began premiered on Tokyo MX October 6, 2012. The series later aired on tvk, BS11 and AT-X. It was later licensed by Sentai Filmworks for release in North America. The opening song is "Friendship" by Ritsuko Okazaki and the ending theme is "Slow Dance" by Suneohair.

Film
The wraparound jacket band of the 11th volume of the manga announced in 2013 that a live action film was greenlit for release in 2014. The film was both directed and written by Asako Hyuga. Haruna Kawaguchi and Sota Fukushi were cast as Mei Tachibana and Yamato Kurosawa respectively. Additional cast members include Tomohiro Ichikawa as Kai Takemura, Rika Adachi as Aiko Mutō, Tasuku Nagase as Kenji Nakanishi, Rima Nishizaki as Asami Oikawa, Ryōsuke Yamamoto as Masashi Tachikawa, and Arisa Yagi as Megumi Kitagawa. Asako Hyuga is directing and writing the film. The film was released in Japan on July 12, 2014. Its main theme song is "Happily" by One Direction.

Reception
The manga has sold over 5.3 million copies as of July 2014. The film earned  at the Japanese box office.

References

External links
 Say "I love you". Official anime website 
Say "I love you". Official live-action film website 

2008 manga
2012 anime television series debuts
Anime series based on manga
Live-action films based on manga
Kodansha manga
Manga adapted into films
Romance anime and manga
School life in anime and manga
Sentai Filmworks
Shochiku films
Shōjo manga
Tokyo MX original programming
Zexcs
Japanese romance films